Mehalchauri (Garhwali : Melchōrí) is a village in Gairsain Tehsil located in Chamoli district in the Indian state of  Uttarakhand.  It is situated in Garhwal mandal nearby the center of the Garhwal and Kumaon mandal.
  
Mehalchauri is 1,350 metres (4,430 ft) above sea level and is the source of the Ramganga River. It is located 125 km from the state capital of Dehradun. It is a religious place and the main market for the villages of Harshari, Pharso, Aagarchatti, Latoogair, and many others. The RamGanga Pul bridge was built in 1963 and connects Chaukhuttiya and Maithan Road to Gairsain.

According to an old tale, the name Mehalchauri comes from the Garhwali language, mehal meaning "little" and chauri meaning the mehal is situated in chauraha, a valley.

Cricket 
Every January the Mehalchauri people host a cricket tournament. Participating teams include Muradabad, Ramnagar, Kashipur, Rudrapur, and Chukhuttiya.

Temples 
Nearby Temples include  Bhairavgadhi in Pandwakhal, Hanuman Mandir in Mehalchauri, Jhankaar in Latoogair and Shivalay in Dhoonarghat.

Nearby towns are Gairsain (12 km), Maithan (18 km), Chaukhuttiya (22 km), Dewal (6.5 km), Tharali (20.5 km), Karnaprayag (60 km) and Ghat (29 km).

Infrastructure 

Mehalchauri is about 5 km from the Almora border at the National Highway 87 extension. The nearest railway station to Mehalchauri is Ramnagar, which is 175 km (108.74 Miles) and Haldwani which is 160 km (99.4 Miles) away. The nearest airport is Gaucher, about 54 km (33.55 Miles) away.

Demography
No. of households: 150 (000?)

Total population: 500 (000?); male 32, female 25

Sex ratio: 70 females per 100 males

Literacy rate: 80.39%; male 96.29%, female 62.5%

References

External links

city